Long Cane Associate Reformed Presbyterian Church is a historic Associate Reformed Presbyterian church in McCormick County, South Carolina four miles west of Troy, South Carolina on SC 33-36. Adjacent to the church building is a cemetery dating to circa 1790.

The church was listed on the National Register of Historic Places in 1999.

History of congregation

Long Cane's origins date to 1771, when the church was established as an Associate Presbyterian congregation, one of several fostered before the American Revolution by Dr. Thomas Clark (d. 1792). Clark and one hundred families had emigrated from Ireland in 1764, and had settled in Stillwater, and then Salem, New York; several families soon moved south, settling near Long Cane Creek, near what was then called "the Calhoun settlement" in the South Carolina backcountry. Dr. Clark himself moved to South Carolina in 1782 and served as minister of the Long Cane, Cedar Creek (later Cedar Springs), and Little Run (or Little River) congregations until he returned to the North in mid-1783, but returned to the Long Cane and Cedar Creek settlement shortly after the American Revolution, remaining here until his death.

The original congregation at Long Cane was called "the Fort Boone congregation" because church, school, and physical security was provided in the fortifications (built after the Indian massacre of 1760) of Fort Boone. The original congregation at Long Cane united with the Cedar Springs Church on March 7, 1786 and withdrew on September 15, 1808. A later part of the congregation moved to the Presbyterian Church during 1818-1819, but reunited with the Cedar Springs Church from 1828 to 1892.

History of current building
This current Greek Revival church building was constructed by William Henry Jones of Atlanta, a building contractor, and dedicated by Dr. Sloan on July 20, 1856. During the dedication Dr. Sloan preached from Habakkuk 2:20, "But the Lord is in His Holy Temple; let all the earth keep silent before Him". The wooden structure is 44 x 64 feet with a 10-foot porch and gallery around three sides. It remains largely original except for additions of small rooms near the pulpit which were added in 1892 when the church discontinued the use of the Session House in back of the church, which had served also as a school. Its cemetery of more than 500 graves includes burials of several charter members of Long Cane Associate Reformed Presbyterian Church from the period 1790-1856, when this church was exceptionally significant in the formation, growth, and development of the Associate Reformed Presbyterian Church as a whole. The church rests on a foundation of handmade brick piers, with a pierced brick curtain wall added at a later date. The façade features a fully engaged tetrastyle Roman Doric portico with an unadorned entablature and a steeply pitched pediment. Originally covered in wooden shingles, the roof was by ca. 1950 covered with diamond-shaped asbestos shingles. A small brick flue pierces the roof ridge at the center of the building. The interior auditorium is two stories in height with flushboard walls and ceiling. The gallery features a continuously paneled knee wall, ranked wooden floors, and simple handmade pews.

List of pastors
Rev. Thomas Clark, 1786–1791
Rev. Peter McMullen, (interim)
Rev. Alex Porter, 1797–1803
Rev. John T. Pressly, 1828–1831
Rev. W. R. Hemphill, 1837–1848
Rev. H. T. Sloan, 1850-1890
Dr. Robert Foster Bradley, 1891–1930

References

 AN HISTORICAL SKETCH of the Long Cane Associate Reformed Presbyterian Church, By Nora Marshall Davis, M. A., D. Lit.
 A transcript made from the original session book of Cedar Springs Associate Reformed Presbyterian Church (Abbeville District), S.C.

External links

Presbyterian churches in South Carolina
Cemeteries in South Carolina
Churches on the National Register of Historic Places in South Carolina
Churches completed in 1856
19th-century Presbyterian church buildings in the United States
Buildings and structures in McCormick County, South Carolina
National Register of Historic Places in McCormick County, South Carolina